Sunnyside is a closed railway station on the Main North railway line in the New England region of New South Wales, Australia. The station opened in 1888 and closed in 1973. Currently only the platform face remains.

See also

Sunnyside rail bridge over Tenterfield Creek
List of railway station in New South Wales

References

Disused regional railway stations in New South Wales
Railway stations in Australia opened in 1888
Railway stations closed in 1973
Main North railway line, New South Wales